Kemialliset Ystävät (Finnish for "Chemical Friends") is the name of a recording project of musician Jan Anderzén of Tampere, Finland. Anderzén began recording under the name in 1995 and although he has enlisted numerous musicians over the years, most Kemialliset Ystävät recordings are solo productions. Often labeled as psychedelic folk, his recordings have included such diverse instruments as detuned guitars, mandolins, balalaikas, toys, hand percussion, and samples from recordings by Sun Ra, Karlheinz Stockhausen and Vibracathedral Orchestra.

Discography
Kellari Juniversumi CD (Fonal Records, 2002)
Alkuhärkä CD (Fonal Records, 2004)
Latvasta Laho CD (Celebrate Psi Phenomenon Records, 2005)
Lumottu Karkkipurkki CD-reissue (Fonal Records, 2005)
Kemialliset ystävät CD/LP/MC (Fonal Records, 2007)
Kemialliset ystävät / Sunroof! (Split #19) CD/DD (Fat Cat Records, 2008)
June (Tomutonttu feat. Henkka) (2009)
Ullakkopalo CD/LP/DD (Fonal Records, 2010)
Alas Rattoisaa Virtaa CD/LP/DD (Dekorder Records, 2014)
Siipi Empii LP (Ikuisuus, 2018) / Cass (Leaving Records, 2018)

References

External links
Official Kemialliset Ystävät site
Kemialliset Ystävät interview @ pHinnWeb

Ystavat, Kemialliset
Finnish musical groups